The Killer Is on the Phone is a 1972 giallo film directed by Alberto De Martino. It was released in the U.S. in July, 1975.
The film is set in Bruges, Belgium, and stars Telly Savalas and Anne Heywood. The story follows an attractive actress who suffers from amnesia and paranoia triggered by a chance encounter with a professional assassin, who in turn begins to follow her with his knife.

Plot
Ranko, a professional killer, is to assassinate Dillon, the emissary sent by the United Nations to help reach an understanding between England, Arab oil suppliers, and the Seven Sisters.

When actress Eleonor Loraine arrives back in Belgium by ferry after a week’s stay in London, Ranko spots her. As soon as she sees him, she loses consciousness. From this moment on, Eleonor suffers from amnesia, which reaches back five years to the death of Peter Vervoort, her lover- supposedly in a car accident. Because she recognised him, Ranko, Peter’s killer (as is revealed near the end), abandons his assignment and keeps following her, waiting for an opportunity to kill her.

Eleonor, home in Bruges, is surprised to find that her house was razed a few years ago. She calls the Flamingo Theater in Bruges to speak to Peter, and her sister Dorothy reminds her that they visited his grave together. Eleonor visits the crypt of Eleonor and Peter Vervoort at the cemetery. (Peter’s mother was also called Eleonor, revealed later.) Dorothy comes to take her to her current home, where Doctor Chandler and George- a theatre critic to whom she has been married for three years- await her, neither of whom she recognises. In a paranoid fit, she believes everybody is acting to drive her mad. Chandler sedates her.

Her actor colleague Thomas Braun- a former secret lover of hers- visits her at the hospital, where Chandler administers a truth serum to cure her. In a slow-motion dream-like vision, she sees herself kissing Peter while Ranko approaches, touching her with his knife and exposing her breasts.

Eleonor goes to the theatre to rehearse the leading role in Lady Godiva, which is to premiere the same week. Ranko awaits her in the lobby but does not strike, irritated that she does not recognise him. On stage, Eleonor erroneously recites the monologue of Lady Macbeth, which was on five years ago.

Walking through Bruges, Eleonor meets a jester who triggers memories. After having sex with Thomas, Eleonor tells him of her first time when she was 13. He calls her a whore, then clings to her legs, saying he cannot live without her. It was a flashback. Coming home at night, Eleonor finds a pistol in the drawer and confronts her husband. When Ranko calls, George picks up; Ranko remains silent. Eleonor sees how George puts something in her drink and runs away.

She remembers telling Thomas to kill Peter. Later, Ranko follows her to Thomas' door, where he stabs her in the stomach. She asks Thomas if she still loves her; he affirms, and she shoots him, then dies of her wound. It is revealed that she relived the end of a play in a flashback and now believes that her current fear of being murdered stems from acting in these plays. Eleonor and Thomas have sex again, through which Eleonor proves to herself that they were never lovers. 
 
In the meantime, Ranko keeps postponing his flight to London. His clients approach him, worrying about the success of Dillon's assassination, for which Ranko was hired.

Margaret Vervoort, Peter’s sister and owner of the theatre, wants Dorothy to take Eleonor's part. Ranko enters Eleonor's dressing room and, from behind, mistakes Dorothy, who is in the nude, for Eleonor. He kisses her violently while stabbing her beneath her left breast.

Margaret tells George that Eleonor owns a small castle near the Sint-Andriesdreef, which she used as a love nest with Peter. George and Eleonor drive to the castle, where she remembers Peter threatening Ranko with a gun and Ranko stabbing him, then driving off with his body in the trunk. She "returns" from her vision only to witness Ranko stab George and escapes by car, hiding in the deserted theatre. Eleonor drops parts of the stage on Ranko, making a piano fall on his legs, which pins him. She then activates the safety curtain, which slowly comes down and crushes his abdomen.

Finally, Eleonor goes to the Vervoort estate to confront Margaret, a gun in her purse. Margaret claims she truly wanted George to save Eleonor from her trauma and did not order Ranko to kill Peter, only to scare him away; she confesses doing it because she wanted Eleonor for herself. Eleonor drops her gun, kisses her, then announces that she will make life hell for her as long as she lives. Eleonor walks away in the sunlight. When she hears a shot from inside, she stops briefly, then continues walking.

Cast 

 Telly Savalas: Ranko Drasovic
 Anne Heywood: Eleanor Loraine 
 Osvaldo Ruggeri: Thomas Brown 
 Giorgio Piazza: George 
 Willeke van Ammelrooy: Dorothy 
 Rossella Falk: Margaret Vervoort 
 Antonio Guidi: Dr. Chandler 
 Roger Van Hool: Peter Vervoort
 Ada Pometti: Nurse

Release
The Killer is on the Phone was released in 1972 and grossed a total of 238 million Italian lire domestically.

The film was released on home video in the United Kingdom as Scenes From a Murder and The Final Curtain. Author Adrian Luther Smith noted that the The Final Curtain release had a particularly "poor quality dark transfer."

Reception
In a contemporary review, Scott Meek of the Monthly Film Bulletin stated that the film "will surely disappoint even the most ardent [Telly Savalas] fans as his contribution consists of scarcely a dozen lines and a series of identical non-expressions presumably intended to appear menacing." and "the greatest mystery of all is the title, which (in this version, at least) bears no relation whatsoever to the plot."

In his overview of gialli film, Troy Howarth described the film as "fairly typical of Alberto De Martino's output: blandly efficient" with "pedestrian direction", and that Aristide Massaccesi's cinematography was "decent but lack[ed] the poetic touch that he brought to What Have You Done to Solange?". Adrian Luther Smith in his book on Italian sex and horror films described the feature as "a fairly routine outing" with Stelvio Cipriani conrtibuting "a middling, but unmemorable score in keeping with the rest of the production."

References

Bibliography

External links

1972 films
1972 crime films
Giallo films
Films directed by Alberto De Martino
Films scored by Stelvio Cipriani
Films shot in Belgium
Films set in Bruges
Films shot in Bruges
Films set in Flanders
English-language Italian films
1970s Italian-language films
1970s Italian films